Vatovlje is a small village in the Municipality of Divača in the Littoral region of Slovenia.

The parish church built just outside the settlement is dedicated to Saint George and belongs to the Koper Diocese.

References

External links

Vatovlje on Geopedia

Populated places in the Municipality of Divača